Mark Rose may refer to:

 Mark Rose (politician) (1924–2008), Canadian politician
 Mark Rose, musician associated with the band Spitalfield